A crane vessel, crane ship or floating crane is a ship with a crane specialized in lifting heavy loads, typically exceeding  for modern ships. The largest crane vessels are used for offshore construction.

The cranes are fitted to conventional monohulls and barges, but the largest crane vessels are often catamaran or semi-submersible types which provide enhanced stability. Many crane vessels are fitted with one or more rotating cranes. Some of the largest crane vessels use fixed sheerlegs instead; in these designs, the crane is cannot rotate relative to the ship, and the vessel therefore is manoeuvered to place loads. Other vessels use large gantry cranes and straddle the load.

History

In medieval Europe, crane vessels which could be flexibly deployed in the whole port basin were introduced as early as the 14th century.

During the age of sail, the sheer hulk was used extensively as a floating crane for tasks that required heavy lift. At the time, the heaviest single components of ships were the main masts, and sheer hulks were essential for removing and replacing them, but they were also used for other purposes. Some crane vessels had engines for propulsion, others needed to be towed with a tugboat.

In 1920, the 1898-built battleship  was converted to a crane ship when a crane with a capacity of 250 tons was installed. Later it was renamed Crane Ship No. 1. It was used, amongst other things, to place guns and other heavy items on other battleships under construction. Another remarkable feat was the raising of the submarine  in 1939.

In 1942, the crane ships a.k.a. "Heavy Lift Ships" SS Empire Elgar (PQ16), SS Empire Bard (PQ15), and SS Empire Purcell (PQ16) were sent to the Russian Arctic ports of Archangelsk, Murmansk and Molotovsk (since renamed Sererodvinsk). Their role was to enable the unloading of the Arctic convoys where port installations were either destroyed by German bombers or were non existent (as at Bakaritsa quay Archangel).

In 1949, J. Ray McDermott had Derrick Barge Four built, a barge that was outfitted with a revolving crane capable of lifting 150 tons. The arrival of this type of vessel changed the direction of the offshore construction industry. Instead of constructing oil platforms in parts, jackets and decks could be built onshore as modules. For use in the shallow part of the Gulf of Mexico, the cradle of the offshore industry, these barges sufficed.

In 1963, Heerema converted a Norwegian tanker, Sunnaas, into a crane vessel with a capacity of 300 tons, the first one in the offshore industry that was ship-shaped. It was renamed Global Adventurer. This type of crane vessel was better adapted to the harsh environment of the North Sea.

Semi-submersible giants
Later both were upgraded to a higher capacity. This type of crane vessel was much less sensitive to sea swell, so that it was possible to operate on the North Sea during the winter months. The high stability also allowed for heavier lifts than was possible with a monohull. The larger capacity of the cranes reduced the installation time of a platform from a whole season to a few weeks. Inspired by this success similar vessels were built. In 1985 DB-102 was launched for McDermott, with two cranes with a capacity of 6,000 tons each. Micoperi ordered M7000 in 1986, designed with two cranes of 7,000 tons each.

However, due to an oil glut in the mid 1980s, the boom in the offshore industry was over, resulting in collaborations. In 1988, a joint venture between Heerema and McDermott was formed, HeereMac. In 1990 Micoperi had to apply for bankruptcy. Saipem – in the beginning of the 1970s a large heavy lift contractor, but only a small player in this field at the end of the 1980s – acquired M7000 from Micoperi in 1995, later renaming it . In 1997 Heerema took over DB-102 from McDermott after discontinuation of their joint venture. The ship was renamed  and subsequently was upgraded in 2000 to a lifting capacity of twice 7,100 tons.

Lifting records
A heaviest single lift record was set in 2000 by Thialf for lifting the  Shearwater topsides for Shell. Saipem 7000 set a new record in October 2004 for the  lift of Sabratha Deck.

Under dynamic positioning, Saipem 7000 set another record in 2010 by lifting the  BP Valhall Production topsides.

Heavy lift vessels

See also 
 Jackup rig
 List of historical harbour cranes
 Ajax (crane barge) lift 250 tons used at Panama canal

References

External links

 A Gigantic Muscle of Steel: it picks up a sunken tugboat from the harbor bottom as easily as you'd lift ten pounds off the floor, Popular Science monthly, February 1919, page 67, Scanned by Google Books

 
Floating cranes
Ship types
Cranes (machines)